Up in the Sky may refer to:

"Up in the Sky", Oasis song from their 1994 album Definitely Maybe
"Up in the Sky" (album), 2011 album by Swiss folk rock band 77 Bombay Street 
"Up in the Sky" (77 Bombay Street song), title track from the similarly titled 77 Bombay Street album
"Up in the Sky", Joe Satriani song from his 1998 album Crystal Planet